Jhirnya, Madhya Pradesh is a village & tehsil in Khargone district in the Indian state of Madhya Pradesh.

Geography
It is a  Tehsil of Khargone district.

References

External links
 Khargone District

Khargone district
Villages in Khargone district